The Brunswick Subdivision is a railroad line owned by CSX Transportation in southeast Georgia. The line runs from Waycross, Georgia, to Brunswick, Georgia on the southeastern coast, a distance of nearly 50 miles. At its northwest end it connects to the Jesup Subdivision in Waycross just east of Rice Yard.

History

Track that is now the Brunswick Subdivision was first chartered in 1835 by the Brunswick and Florida Railroad (which ran from Brunswick to Glenmore, which is about 10 miles west of Waycross, Georgia).  The president of the Brunswick and Florida Railroad was Charles Schlatter, for whom the ghost town of Schlatterville along the line is named.  In 1863, the government of the Confederate States of America took much of the B&F's track and used it elsewhere for more vital railroad links.  After the war in 1869, the State of Georgia provided about $6 million in bonds to rebuild.

The railroad was then reorganized and rebuilt as the Brunswick and Albany Railroad in 1869.  When rebuilt, its northwest end was rerouted to Waycross (known then as Tebeauville).  The line would extended as far as Albany, Georgia (some of this line north and west of Waycross today is the Pearson Spur).  In 1882, the lines name would change again to the Brunswick and Western Railroad.

In 1888, the railroad was purchased by the Plant System and was fully integrated into the system by 1901.  The Savannah, Florida and Western Railway, which was the Plant System's main line, crossed the Brunswick and Western in Waycross.

In 1902, the entire Plant System was bought by the Atlantic Coast Line Railroad.  The Atlantic Coast Line operated the line as their Waycross–Brunswick Line (O Line).  The Atlantic Coast Line became the Seaboard Coast Line Railroad in 1967 after merging with their former rival, the Seaboard Air Line Railroad.  The Seaboard Coast Line gave the line its current designation, the Brunswick Subdivision.  In 1980, the Seaboard Coast Line's parent company merged with the Chessie System, creating the CSX Corporation.  The CSX Corporation initially operated the Chessie and Seaboard Systems separately until 1986, when they were merged into CSX Transportation.

See also
 List of CSX Transportation lines

References

CSX Transportation lines